Diana Bachmann (b. 1940s) is a British writer of 6 historical novels from 1985 to 1998. She also wrote 11 thriller novels under the pen name Max Marlow in collaboration with her husband, prolific writer Christopher Nicole. They live in Guernsey, Channel Islands

Bibliography

Single novels
 Beyond the Sunset (1985)
 Janthina (1987)
 Tides of the Heart (1987)

Guernsey Saga
 A Sound Like Thunder (1996)
 An Elusive Freedom (1997)
 Winds of Change (1998)

As Max Marlow

Novels
 Her Name Will Be Faith (1988)
 The Red Death (1990)
 Meltdown (1991)
 Arctic Peril (1993)
 Growth (1993)
 Where the River Rises (1994)
 Shadow at Evening (1994)
 The Burning Rocks (1995)
 Hell's Children (1996)
 Dry (1997)
 The Trench (1998)

References and sources 
 
 

1950 births
Guernsey writers
British thriller writers
Living people